In mathematical logic, Goodstein's theorem is a statement about the natural numbers, proved by Reuben Goodstein in 1944, which states that every Goodstein sequence eventually terminates at 0. Kirby and Paris showed that it is unprovable in Peano arithmetic (but it can be proven in stronger systems, such as second-order arithmetic). This was the third example of a true statement that is unprovable in Peano arithmetic, after the examples provided by Gödel's incompleteness theorem and Gerhard Gentzen's 1943 direct proof of the unprovability of ε0-induction in Peano arithmetic. The Paris–Harrington theorem gave another example.

Laurence Kirby and Jeff Paris introduced a graph-theoretic hydra game with behavior similar to that of Goodstein sequences: the "Hydra" (named for the mythological multi-headed Hydra of Lerna) is a rooted tree, and a move consists of cutting off one of its "heads" (a branch of the tree), to which the hydra responds by growing a finite number of new heads according to certain rules.  Kirby and Paris proved that the Hydra will eventually be killed, regardless of the strategy that Hercules uses to chop off its heads, though this may take a very long time. Just like for Goodstein sequences, Kirby and Paris showed that it cannot be proven in Peano arithmetic alone.

Hereditary base-n notation 
Goodstein sequences are defined in terms of a concept called "hereditary base-n notation". This notation is very similar to usual base-n positional notation, but the usual notation does not suffice for the purposes of Goodstein's theorem.

In ordinary base-n notation, where n is a natural number greater than 1, an arbitrary natural number m is written as a sum of multiples of powers of n:

For example, in base 2,

Thus the base-2 representation of 35 is 100011, which means .  Similarly, 100 represented in base-3 is 10201:

Note that the exponents themselves are not written in base-n notation. For example, the expressions above include 25 and 34, and 5 > 2, 4 > 3.

To convert a base-n representation to hereditary base-n notation, first rewrite all of the exponents in base-n notation. Then rewrite any exponents inside the exponents, and continue in this way until every number appearing in the expression (except the bases themselves) has been converted to base-n notation.

using the fact that  Similarly, 100 in hereditary base-3 notation is

Goodstein sequences 

The Goodstein sequence  G(m) of a number m is a sequence of natural numbers. The first element in the sequence G(m) is m itself. To get the second, G(m)(2), write m in hereditary base-2 notation, change all the 2s to 3s, and then subtract 1 from the result. In general, the  term, of the Goodstein sequence of m is as follows:
 Take the hereditary base- representation of G(m)(n).
 Subtract one. (Note that the next term depends both on the previous term and on the index n.)
 Continue until the result is zero, at which point the sequence terminates.

Early Goodstein sequences terminate quickly. For example, G(3) terminates at the 6th step:

Later Goodstein sequences increase for a very large number of steps. For example, G(4)  starts as follows:

Elements of G(4) continue to increase for a while, but at base ,

However, even G(4) doesn't give a good idea of just how quickly the elements of a Goodstein sequence can increase.
G(19) increases much more rapidly and starts as follows:

In spite of this rapid growth, Goodstein's theorem states that every Goodstein sequence eventually terminates at 0, no matter what the starting value is.

Proof of Goodstein's theorem 

Goodstein's theorem can be proved (using techniques outside Peano arithmetic, see below) as follows: Given a Goodstein sequence G(m), we construct a parallel sequence P(m) of ordinal numbers in Cantor normal form which is strictly decreasing and terminates. A common misunderstanding of this proof is to believe that G(m) goes to 0 because it is dominated by P(m). Actually, the fact that P(m) dominates G(m) plays no role at all. The important point is: G(m)(k) exists if and only if P(m)(k) exists (parallelism), and comparison between two members of G(m) is preserved when comparing corresponding entries of P(m). Then if P(m) terminates, so does G(m). By infinite regress, G(m) must reach 0, which guarantees termination.

For example, .

Each term P(m)(n) of the sequence P(m) is then defined as f(G(m)(n),n+1). Addition, multiplication and exponentiation of ordinal numbers are well defined.

We claim that :

Let  be  G(m)(n) after applying the first, 
base-changing operation in generating the next element of the Goodstein sequence, 
but before the second minus 1 operation in this generation. 
Observe that .

Then .
Note that in order to calculate f(G(m)(n),n+1), we first need to write G(m)(n) in hereditary base  notation, as for instance the expression  is not an ordinal.

Thus the sequence P(m) is strictly decreasing. As the standard order < on ordinals is well-founded, an infinite strictly decreasing sequence cannot exist, or equivalently, every strictly decreasing sequence of ordinals terminates (and cannot be infinite). But P(m)(n) is calculated directly from G(m)(n). Hence the sequence G(m) must terminate as well, meaning that it must reach 0.

While this proof of Goodstein's theorem is fairly easy, the Kirby–Paris theorem, which shows that Goodstein's theorem is not a theorem of Peano arithmetic, is technical and considerably more difficult. It makes use of countable nonstandard models of Peano arithmetic.

Extended Goodstein's theorem 

Suppose the definition of the Goodstein sequence is changed so that instead of
replacing each occurrence of the base b with 
Would the sequence still terminate?
More generally, let b1, b2, b3, … be any sequences of integers.
Then let the 
term  of the extended Goodstein sequence of m be as
follows: take the hereditary base bn representation of
G(m)(n) and replace each occurrence of the base bn
The claim is that this sequence still terminates.
The extended proof defines  as
follows: take the hereditary base bn representation of
G(m)(n), and replace each occurrence of the base
bn with the first infinite ordinal number ω.
The base-changing operation of the Goodstein sequence when going
from G(m)(n) to  still does not change the value of f.
For example, if  and if ,
then
, hence the ordinal  is strictly greater than the ordinal

Sequence length as a function of the starting value 

The Goodstein function, is defined such that  is the length of the Goodstein sequence that starts with n.  (This is a total function since every Goodstein sequence terminates.)  The extreme growth-rate of  can be calibrated by relating it to various standard ordinal-indexed hierarchies of functions, such as the functions  in the Hardy hierarchy, and the functions  in the fast-growing hierarchy of Löb and Wainer:

 Kirby and Paris (1982) proved that
(For any two functions ,  is said to dominate  if  for all sufficiently large .)

 Cichon (1983) showed that

where  is the result of putting n in hereditary base-2 notation and then replacing all 2s with ω (as was done in the proof of Goodstein's theorem).

 Caicedo (2007) showed that if  with  then
.

Some examples:

(For Ackermann function and Graham's number bounds see fast-growing hierarchy#Functions in fast-growing hierarchies.)

Application to computable functions 

Goodstein's theorem can be used to construct a total computable function that Peano arithmetic cannot prove to be total.  The Goodstein sequence of a number can be effectively enumerated by a Turing machine; thus the function which maps n to the number of steps required for the Goodstein sequence of n to terminate is computable by a particular Turing machine.  This machine merely enumerates the Goodstein sequence of n and, when the sequence reaches 0, returns the length of the sequence.  Because every Goodstein sequence eventually terminates, this function is total.   But because Peano arithmetic does not prove that every Goodstein sequence terminates, Peano arithmetic does not prove that this Turing machine computes a total function.

See also
 Non-standard model of arithmetic
 Fast-growing hierarchy
 Paris–Harrington theorem
 Kanamori–McAloon theorem
 Kruskal's tree theorem

References

Bibliography
 .
 .
 .

External links
 
Some elements of a proof that Goodstein's theorem is not a theorem of PA, from an undergraduate thesis by Justin T Miller
  A Classification of non standard models of Peano Arithmetic by Goodstein's theorem - Thesis by Dan Kaplan, Franklan and Marshall College Library
Definition of Goodstein sequences in Haskell and the lambda calculus
 The Hydra game implemented as a Java applet
 Javascript implementation of a variant of the Hydra game
 Goodstein Sequences: The Power of a Detour via Infinity - good exposition with illustrations of Goodstein Sequences and the hydra game.
 Goodstein Calculator

Independence results
Articles containing proofs
Set theory
Theorems in the foundations of mathematics
Large numbers
Integer sequences
Numeral systems